Asha Makuto (born 2 May 1986) is a retired Kenyan female volleyball player. She was part of the Kenya women's national volleyball team.

She participated at the 2010 FIVB Volleyball Women's World Championship in Japan. She played with Kenya Pipeline Company.

Clubs
  Kenya Pipeline Company (2010)

References

1986 births
Living people
Kenyan women's volleyball players